Menshikov may refer to
Menshikov (surname)
Menshikov Island in the Sea of Okhotsk
Menshikov Atoll, a former name of Kwajalein Atoll, part of the Marshall Islands
Menshikov Palace (Saint Petersburg)
Menshikov Tower in Moscow, Russia